La Concha may refer to:

 La Concha Resort, a resort located in the Condado District San Juan, Puerto Rico
 La Concha Motel, a museum on the Las Vegas Strip, Nevada, United States
 Beach of La Concha and La Concha Bay, in San Sebastián, Basque Autonomous Community, Spain

See also
 Conch
 Concha (disambiguation)
 De la Concha (disambiguation)